North Carolina elected its members August 12, 1819, after the new congress began but before the first session convened.

See also 
 1818 and 1819 United States House of Representatives elections
 List of United States representatives from North Carolina

Notes 

1819
North Carolina
United States House of Representatives